"Ain't Gonna Hurt Nobody" is a song performed by American hip hop group Kid 'n Play. It was issued as the first single from their third studio album Face the Nation, as well as appearing on the soundtrack to the film House Party 2. The song samples the Brick song of the same name, as well as "Funky President (People It's Bad)" by James Brown.

Co-written by group member Christopher "Kid" Reid, "Ain't Gonna Hurt Nobody" was the group's only single to chart on the Billboard Hot 100, peaking at number 51 on the chart in 1991. It was also the group's second single to peak at number one on the Billboard rap chart.

Chart positions

References

External links
 
 

1991 songs
1991 singles
Elektra Records singles
Kid 'n Play songs
Select Records singles